Simone Berriau (21 July 1896 - 26 February 1984) was a French actress. She appeared in more than ten films from 1933 to 1942.

Selected filmography

References

External links 

1896 births
1984 deaths
French film actresses
20th-century French women